Molly and Me is a 1929 American comedy film directed by Albert Ray and starring Belle Bennett, Joe E. Brown and Alberta Vaughn.

Cast
 Belle Bennett as Molly Wilson 
 Joe E. Brown as Jim Wilson 
 Alberta Vaughn as Peggy 
 Charles Byer as Dan Kingsley

References

Bibliography
 Pitts, Michael R. Poverty Row Studios, 1929–1940: An Illustrated History of 55 Independent Film Companies, with a Filmography for Each. McFarland & Company, 2005.

External links

1929 films
1929 comedy films
1920s English-language films
American comedy films
Films directed by Albert Ray
Tiffany Pictures films
American black-and-white films
1920s American films